The Australian Open is an annual tennis tournament created in 1905 and (since 1988) played on outdoor hardcourts at Melbourne Park in Melbourne, Australia. The Australian Open is played over a two-week period beginning in mid-January and has been chronologically the first of the four Grand Slam tournaments each year since 1987. The event was not held from 1916 to 1918 because of World War I, from 1941 to 1945 because of World War II and in 1986. The timing of the Australian Open has changed several times.  In 1977, the date of the final moved from January to December, which resulted in having two Australian Opens in 1977; there was a January edition and a December edition that year. The originally planned December 1986 edition was moved forward to January 1987, resulting in no Australian Open in 1986. The Australian Open was an Open Era event for the first time in 1969. One year previously in 1968 the French Open, Wimbledon and the US Open were Open Era events for the first time.

History
Christchurch and Hastings, New Zealand, and Perth, Brisbane, Adelaide, Sydney and Melbourne, Australia, have hosted the men's singles event.  The event switched cities every year before it settled in 1972 in Melbourne. The event was held at the Kooyong Stadium before moving to Melbourne Park in 1988.

The Australian Open court surface changed once, from grass courts to hardcourts in 1988. Mats Wilander was the only player to win the event on both surfaces; twice on grass and once on hardcourt.

The men's singles rules have undergone several changes since the first edition. This event has always been contested in a knockout format, and all matches have been best-of-five sets except in 1970, 1973, and 1974, when the first round was best-of-three sets, and in 1982, when the third and fourth round were best-of-three sets. Since 1905, all sets have been decided in the advantage format. The lingering death best-of-twelve points tie-break was introduced in 1971 and has been used for the first four sets since then, except from 1980 to 1982, when the tie-break was also played in fifth sets.

The champion receives a miniature replica of the silver-gilt Norman Brookes Challenge Cup, named after the 1911 champion and former Lawn Tennis Association of Australia (LTAA) president, and modeled after the Warwick Vase.

In the Australasian Championships, James Anderson holds the records for most titles with three (1922, 1924–1925), and the most consecutive titles with two (1924–1925). In the Australian Championships, Roy Emerson holds the records for most titles with six (1961, 1963–1967) and most consecutive titles with five (1963–1967). The inclusion of professional tennis players in 1969 marked the competition's entry into the Open Era, in which Novak Djokovic (2008, 2011–2013, 2015–2016, 2019–2021, 2023) holds the record for most titles with ten. The Open Era record for most consecutive titles is three by Djokovic (2011–2013 and 2019–2021). This event was won without losing a set during the Open Era by Rosewall in 1971 and Federer in 2007.

Champions

Australian Championships

Australian Open

Statistics

Multiple champions

Champions by country

See also

Australian Open other competitions
List of Australian Open women's singles champions
List of Australian Open men's doubles champions 
List of Australian Open women's doubles champions
List of Australian Open mixed doubles champions

Grand Slam men's singles
 List of French Open men's singles champions
 List of Wimbledon gentlemen's singles champions
 List of US Open men's singles champions
 List of Grand Slam men's singles champions

Notes

References

General

Specific

External links
Australian Open official website

 

Men
aus